Zhang Fuxin (Chinese: 張 阜新; born September 1, 1961) is a retired male racewalker from PR China, who competed at the 1984 Summer Olympics for his native country.

Achievements

References
sports-reference

1961 births
Living people
Chinese male racewalkers
Athletes (track and field) at the 1984 Summer Olympics
Olympic athletes of China
Asian Games medalists in athletics (track and field)
Athletes (track and field) at the 1982 Asian Games
Asian Games bronze medalists for China
Medalists at the 1982 Asian Games